Jacob Liboschütz was a Russian Empire medical doctor; born in 1741.  He died in Vilna on 10 February 1827. After studying at the University of Halle he went to St. Petersburg. His religious belief, however, rendered it impossible for him to settle there, and he established himself at Vilna, where he became celebrated. When the famous physician Professor Frank was leaving Vilna and was asked in whose charge he had left the public health, he answered, "In the charge of God and the Jew" ("Deus et Judeus," meaning "God and Liboschütz"). Liboschütz was celebrated also as a diplomat and philanthropist (Fuenn, Kiryah Ne'emanah, p. 260, Vilna, 1860).

References

1741 births
1827 deaths
Physicians from Vilnius
Jews from the Russian Empire
Physicians from the Russian Empire
Diplomats from Vilnius
German emigrants to the Russian Empire
Philanthropists from the Russian Empire